Avlo (short for Alta Velocidad Low Cost  literally "No Frills High Speed" ) is the name of the Spanish low-cost high-speed rail service, at the start between of the cities of Madrid, Zaragoza and Barcelona, by the national rail company Renfe.

History 

Based on the popularity of the French low-cost high-speed rail service Ouigo that was introduced in 2013 by French national rail company SNCF, and keen to encourage train travel on the Spanish high-speed rail network, Renfe was interested in setting up their own such budget service. The service was announced on 6 February 2018 by the then Minister of Public Works Íñigo de la Serna. It was provisionally named "eva", the name of the Renfe's own high-speed train service, AVE, spelt backwards and was aimed to be operational by the first quarter of 2019. 

The plan was for trains to run between Madrid and less frequently used AVE stations in Catalonia, namely Camp de Tarragona and El Prat de Llobregat, the latter only around 10 km from Barcelona's Sants terminus. This concept resembles the strategy of Avlo's potential low-cost competitor Ouigo, which goes to Tourcoing rather than the larger station Lille-Europe. 

However, after a series of delays and with the prospect of new competitors operating as of late 2020, such as the airline Air Nostrum, the Italian rail company Trenitalia, and Ouigo, a subsidiary of French rail company SNCF, Renfe felt obliged to revive the plans for a low-cost rail service of their own. Renfe went back to the drawing board and new sets of proposals for the service were announced on 11 December 2019, with services planned to begin on 6 April 2020 during the 2020 Easter holidays. Avlo was set to run between the stations Madrid Atocha, Zaragoza Delicias and Barcelona Sants. In contrast with earlier plans, the service was to stop in Zaragoza rather than Tarragona.

On the 15 March 2020 Renfe announced that due to the COVID-19 pandemic, the launch of the service would be postponed until further notice. Customers who had paid a promotional fare of €5 were given the option to travel at a later date, while non-promotional tickets were refunded in full. 

Avlo services between Madrid, Barcelona and Figueres on the French border commenced on 23 June 2021. Three daily services in each direction run between Madrid and Barcelona, while a fourth service stops in Guadalajara, Calatayud, Saragossa, Lleida, Tarragona, Barcelona, Girona and terminates in Figueres. As in the previous attempt to launch this service, promotional ticket prices start at €5. Six return services between Madrid and Valencia commenced on 21 February 2022. From 28 March 2023 four new daily services are scheduled to start between Madrid and Alicante while in June 2023 Renfe also aims to run trains from Madrid to Seville and Malaga.

Background 
The Avlo service would consist of modified purple-coloured Talgo AVE trains. They will use the future S 106 trains with 581 seats, or the S 112 trains will be upgraded to 438 seats, both in all-second class configuration. Renfe has reported it is going to price tickets of the Avlo as low as €10, compared to the lowest offer of €48 for the normal AVE ticket for Madrid and Barcelona.

See also 
Ouigo España - A competitor service by SNCF
Iryo - a competitor service by Trenitalia/Air Nostrum
Ouigo - the French low-cost high speed rail service
IZY - A low-cost high-speed rail service between Paris and Brussels

References

External links  
 Official website
 Corporate website

AVE high-speed trains
High-speed rail in Spain
Renfe
Regional rail in Spain
Low-cost high-speed rail services